Sophia ( "Wisdom",  "the Sophia") is a major theme, along with Knowledge ( gnosis, Coptic ), among many of the early Christian knowledge-theologies grouped by the heresiologist Irenaeus as , "knowing" or "men that claimed to have deeper wisdom".   Gnosticism is a 17th-century term expanding the definition of Irenaeus' groups to include other syncretic and mystery religions.

In Gnosticism, Sophia is a feminine figure, analogous to the human soul but also simultaneously one of the feminine aspects of God. Gnostics held that she was the syzygy (female twin divine Aeon) of Jesus (i.e. the Bride of Christ), and Holy Spirit of the Trinity. In the Nag Hammadi texts, Sophia is the lowest Aeon, or anthropic expression of the emanation of the light of God. She is considered to have fallen from grace in some way, in so doing creating or helping to create the material world.

Gnostic mythos

Almost all Gnostic systems of the Syrian or Egyptian type taught that the universe began with an original, unknowable God, referred to as the Parent or Bythos, or as the Monad by Monoimus. From this initial unitary beginning, the One spontaneously emanated further Aeons, being pairs of progressively 'lesser' beings in sequence. Together with the source from which they emanate they form the Pleroma, or fullness, of God, and thus should not be seen as distinct from the divine, but symbolic abstractions of the divine nature. The transition from the immaterial to the material, from the noumenal to the sensible, is brought about by a flaw, or a passion, or a sin, in one of the Aeons.

In most versions of the Gnostic mythos, it is Sophia who brings about this instability in the Pleroma, in turn bringing about the creation of materiality. According to some Gnostic texts, the crisis occurs as a result of Sophia trying to emanate without her syzygy or, in another tradition, because she tries to breach the barrier between herself and the unknowable Bythos. After cataclysmically falling from the Pleroma, Sophia's fear and anguish of losing her life (just as she lost the light of the One) causes confusion and longing to return to it. Because of these longings, matter (Greek:) and  soul (Greek:) accidentally come into existence. The creation of the Demiurge (also known as Yaldabaoth, "Son of Chaos") is also a mistake made during this exile. The Demiurge proceeds to create the physical world in which we live, ignorant of Sophia, who nevertheless manages to infuse some spiritual spark or pneuma into his creation.

In the Pistis Sophia, Christ is sent from the Godhead in order to bring Sophia back into the fullness (Pleroma). Christ enables her to again see the light, bringing her knowledge of the spirit (Greek:). Christ is then sent to earth in the form of the man Jesus to give men the Gnosis needed to rescue themselves from the physical world and return to the spiritual world. In Gnosticism, the Gospel story of Jesus is itself allegorical: it is the Outer Mystery, used as an introduction to Gnosis, rather than it being literally true in a historical context. For the Gnostics, the drama of the redemption of the Sophia through Christ or the Logos is the central drama of the universe. The Sophia resides in all humans as the Divine Spark.

Book of Proverbs
Jewish Alexandrine religious philosophy was much occupied with the concept of the Divine Sophia, as the revelation of God's inward thought, and assigned to her not only the formation and ordering of the natural universe (comp. Clem. Hom. xvi. 12) but also the communication of knowledge to mankind. In  Wisdom (the noun is feminine) is described as God's Counsellor and Workmistress (Master-workman, R.V.), who dwelt beside Him before the Creation of the world and sported continually before Him.

In accordance with the description given in the Book of Proverbs, a dwelling-place was assigned by the Gnostics to the Sophia, and her relation to the upper world defined as well as to the seven planetary powers which were placed under her. The seven planetary spheres or heavens were for the ancients the highest regions of the created universe. They were thought of as seven circles rising one above another, and dominated by the seven Archons. These constituted the (Gnostic) Hebdomad. Above the highest of them, and over-vaulting it, was the Ogdoad, the sphere of immutability, which was nigh to the spiritual world (Clemens Alexandrinus, Stromata, iv. 25, 161; comp. vi. 16, 138 sqq.). Now we read in :

These seven pillars being interpreted as the planetary heavens, the habitation of the Sophia herself was placed above the Hebdomad in the Ogdoad (Excerpt. ex Theodot. 8, 47). It is said further of the same divine wisdom:

She sits at "the gates of the mighty," i.e. at the approaches to the realms of the seven Archons, and at the "entrances" to the upper realm of light her praise is sung. The Sophia is therefore the highest ruler over the visible universe, and at the same time the mediatrix between the upper and the lower realms. She shapes this mundane universe after the heavenly prototypes, and forms the seven star-circles with their Archons under whose dominion are placed, according to the astrological conceptions of antiquity, the fates of all earthly things, and more especially of man. She is "the mother" or "the mother of the living." (Epiph. Haer. 26, 10).

Descent
In reconciling the doctrine of the pneumatic nature of the Sophia with the dwelling-place assigned her, according to the Proverbs, in the kingdom of the midst, and so outside the upper realm of light, there was envisioned a descent of Sophia from her heavenly home, the Pleroma, into the void beneath it. But inasmuch as the light brought down into the darkness of this lower world was thought of and described as involved in suffering, this suffering must be regarded as a punishment. This inference was further aided by the Platonic notion of a spiritual fall.

Mythos of the soul

Alienated through their own fault from their heavenly home, souls have sunk down into this lower world without utterly losing the remembrance of their former state, and filled with longing for their lost inheritance, these fallen souls are still striving upwards. In this way the mythos of the fall of Sophia can be regarded as having a typical significance. The fate of the "mother" was regarded as the prototype of what is repeated in the history of all individual souls, which, being of a heavenly pneumatic origin, have fallen from the upper world of light their home, and come under the sway of evil powers, from whom they must endure a long series of sufferings until a return into the upper world be once more vouchsafed them.

But whereas, according to the Platonic philosophy, fallen souls still retain a remembrance of their lost home, this notion was preserved in another form in Gnostic circles. It was taught that the souls of the Pneumatici, having lost the remembrance of their heavenly derivation, required to become once more partakers of Gnosis, or knowledge of their own pneumatic essence, in order to make a return to the realm of light. In the impartation of this Gnosis consists the redemption brought and vouchsafed by Christ to pneumatic souls. But the various fortunes of such souls were wont to be contemplated in those of Sophia, and so it was taught that the Sophia also needed the redemption wrought by Christ, by whom she is delivered from her  and her , and will, at the end of the world's development, be again brought back to her long lost home, the Upper Pleroma, into which this mother will find an entrance along with all pneumatic souls her children, and there, in the heavenly bridal chamber, celebrate the marriage feast of eternity.

Syrian Gnosis

The Sophia mythos has in the various Gnostic systems undergone great variety of treatment. The oldest, the Syrian Gnosis, referred to the Sophia the formation of the lower world and the production of its rulers the Archons; and along with this they also ascribed to her the preservation and propagation of the spiritual seed.

Formation of the lower world 

As described by Irenaeus, the great Mother-principle of the universe appears as the first woman, the Holy Spirit moving over the waters, and is also called the mother of all living. Under her are the four material elements—water, darkness, abyss, and chaos. With her, combine themselves into two supreme masculine lights, the first and the second man, the Father and the Son, the latter being also designated as the Father's . From their union proceeds the third imperishable light, the third man, Christ. But unable to support the abounding fullness of this light, the mother in giving birth to Christ, suffers a portion of this light to overflow on the left side. And this is the Sophia, called also  (she of the left hand),  and the male-female.

There is here, as yet, no thought of a fall, properly so called, as in the Valentinian system. The power which has thus overflowed leftwards, makes a voluntary descent into the lower waters, confiding in its possession of the spark of true light. She compasses about, and is laden with material every kind of weight and substance, so that, but for the essential spark of light, she would be sunk and lost in the material. Bound to the body which she has assumed and weighed down thereby, she seeks in vain to make her escape from the lower waters, and hasten upwards to rejoin her heavenly mother. Finally seized with a longing for the higher light, she finds, at length, in herself, the power to raise herself even above the heaven of her own forming, and to fully lay aside her corporeity. The body thus abandoned is called "Woman from Woman."

Creation and redemption
The narrative proceeds to tell of the formation of the seven Archons by Sophia herself, of the creation of man, which "the mother" (i.e. not the first woman, but the Sophia) uses as a mean to deprive the Archons of their share of light, of the perpetual conflict on his mother's part with the self-exalting efforts of the Archons, and of her continuous striving to recover again and again the light-spark hidden in human nature, till, at length, Christ comes to her assistance and in answer to her prayers, proceeds to draw all the sparks of light to Himself, unites Himself with the Sophia as the bridegroom with the bride, descends on Jesus who has been prepared, as a pure vessel for His reception, by Sophia, and leaves him again before the crucifixion, ascending with Sophia into the world or Aeon which will never pass away (Irenaeus, i. 30; Epiph. 37, 3, sqq.; Theodoret, h. f. i. 14).

As world-soul
In this system the original cosmogonic significance of the Sophia still stands in the foreground. The antithesis of Christus and Sophia, as He of the right and She of the Left, as male and female, is but a repetition of the first Cosmogonic Antithesis in another form. The Sophia herself is but a reflex of the "Mother of all living" and is therefore also called "Mother."

Prunikos

In the Gnostic system described by Irenaeus (I. xxi.; see Ophites) the name Prunikos several times takes the place of Sophia in the relation of her story. The name Prunikos is also given to Sophia in the account of the kindred Barbeliot system, given in the preceding chapter of Irenaeus. Celsus, who shows that he had met with some Ophite work, exhibits acquaintance with the name Prunikos (Orig. Adv. Cels. vi. 34) a name which Origen recognizes as Valentinian. That this Ophite name had really been adopted by the Valentinians is evidenced by its occurrence in a Valentinian fragment preserved by Epiphanius (Epiph. Haer. xxxi. 5). Epiphanius also introduces Prunikos as a technical word in the system of the Simonians (Epiph. Haer. xxi. 2) of those whom he describes under the head of Nicolaitans (Epiph. Haer. xxv. 3, 4) and of the Ophites (Epiph. Haer. xxxvii. 4, 6).

Etymology
Neither Irenaeus nor Origen indicates that he knew anything as to the meaning of this word; and we have no better information on this subject than a conjecture of Epiphanius (Epiph. Haer. xxv. 48). He says that the word means "wanton" or "lascivious," for that the Greeks had a phrase concerning a man who had debauched a girl, . One feels some hesitation in accepting this explanation. Epiphanius was deeply persuaded of the filthiness of Gnostic morals, and habitually put the worst interpretation on their language. If the phrase reported by Epiphanius had been common, it is strange that instances of its use should not have been quoted from the Greek comic writers. It need not be denied that Epiphanius had heard the phrase employed, but innocent words come to be used in an obscene sense, as well by those who think double entendre witty, as by those who modestly avoid the use of plainer language. Then, modifying its meaning like the word , it came to be used in the sense of a turbulent violent person. The only distinct confirmation of the explanation of Epiphanius is that Hesychius (s. v. Skitaloi) has the words . This would be decisive, if we could be sure that these words were earlier in date than Epiphanius.

In favour of the explanation of Epiphanius is the fact, that in the Gnostic cosmogonical myths, the imagery of sexual passion is constantly introduced. According to Ernst Wilhelm Möller (1860) the name is possibly meant to indicate her attempts to entice away again from the lower Cosmic Powers the seed of Divine light. In the account given by Epiphanius (Haer. 37:6) the allusion to enticements to sexual intercourse which is involved in this name, becomes more prominent.

However, in the Exegesis on the Soul text found at Nag Hammadi, the soul is likened to a woman which fell from perfection into prostitution, and that the Father will elevate her again to her original perfect state. In this context, the female personification of the soul resembles the passion of Sophia as Prunikos.

The womb, mētra
Nigh related to this is the notion widely diffused among Gnostic sects of the impure mētra (womb) whence the whole world is supposed to have issued. As according to the Italian Valentinians the Soter opens the mētra of the lower Sophia, (the ), and so occasions the formation of the universe (Iren. I. 3, 4) so on the other hand the mētra itself is personified. So Epiphanius reports the following cosmogony as that of a branch of the Nicolaitans:

The Sethians (Hippolytus. These have the form of a mētra with the omphalos in the midst. The pregnant mētra therefore contains within itself all kinds of animal forms in the reflex of heaven and earth and all substances found in the middle region. This mētra also encounters us in the great Apophasis ascribed to Simon where it is also called Paradise and Eden as being the locality of man's formation.

These cosmogonic theories have their precedent in the Thalatth or Tiamat of Syrian mythology, the life-mother of whom Berossus has so much to relate, or in the world-egg out of which when cloven asunder heaven and earth and all things proceed. The name of this Berossian Thalatth meets us again among the Peratae of the Philosophumena (Hippolytus, Philosophum. v. 9) and is sometimes mistakenly identified with that of the sea—thalassa.

Baruch–Gnosis
A similar part to that of the mētra is played by Edem, consort of Elohim in Justin's Gnostic book Baruch (Hippolytus, Philosoph. v. 18 sqq.) who there appears as a two-shaped being formed above as a woman and from the middle downwards as a serpent (21).

Among the four and twenty Angels which she bears to Elohim, and which form the world out of her members, the second female angelic form is called Achamōs [Achamōth]. Like to this legend of the Philosophumena concerning the Baruch-Gnosis is that which is related by Epiphanius of an Ophite Party that they fabled that a Serpent from the Upper World had had sexual intercourse with the Earth as with a woman (Epiphanius, Haer. 45: 1 cf. 2).

Barbeliotae 
Very nigh related to the doctrines of the Gnostics in Irenaeus are the views of the so-called Barbeliotae (Iren. I. 29). The name Barbelo, which according to one interpretation is a designation of the upper Tetrad, has originally nothing to do with the Sophia. Sophia seeing that all the rest have each its syzygos within the Pleroma, desires also to find such a consort for herself; and not finding one in the upper world she looks down into the lower regions and being still unsatisfied there she descends at length against the will of the Father into the deep. Here she forms the Demiurge (the Proarchōn), a composite of ignorance and self-exaltation. This Being, by virtue of pneumatic powers stolen from his mother, proceeds to form the lower world. The mother, on the other hand, flees away into the upper regions and makes her dwelling there in the Ogdoad.

The Ophites
We meet this Sophia also among the Ophiana whose "Diagram" is described by Celsus and Origen, as well as among various Gnostic (Ophite) parties mentioned by Epiphanius. She is there called Sophia or Prunikos, the upper mother and upper power, and sits enthroned above the Hebdomad (the seven Planetary Heavens) in the Ogdoad (Origen, Against Celsus. vi. 31, 34, 35, 38; Epiphan. Haer. 25, 3 sqq. 26, 1,10. 39, 2 ; 40, 2). She is also occasionally called Parthenos (Orig. c. Cels. vi. 31) and again is elsewhere identified with the Barbelo or Barbero (Epiph. Haer. 25, 3 ; 26, 1, 10).

Simon Magus

The Ennoia
This mythos of the soul and her descent into this lower world, with her various sufferings and changing fortunes until her final deliverance, recurs in the Simonian system under the form of the All-Mother who issues as its first thought from the Hestōs or highest power of God. She generally bears the name Ennoia, but is also called Wisdom (Sophia), Ruler, Holy Spirit, Prunikos, Barbelo. Having sunk down from the highest heavens into the lowest regions, she creates angels and archangels, and these again create and rule the material universe. Restrained and held down by the power of this lower world, she is hindered from returning to the kingdom of the Father. According to one representation she suffers all manner of insult from the angels and archangels bound and forced again and again into fresh earthly bodies, and compelled for centuries to wander in ever new corporeal forms. According to another account she is in herself incapable of suffering, but is sent into this lower world and undergoes perpetual transformation in order to excite by her beauty the angels and powers, to impel them to engage in perpetual strife, and so gradually to deprive them of their store of heavenly light. The Hestōs himself at length comes down from the highest heaven in a phantasmal body in order to deliver the suffering Ennoia, and redeem the souls held in captivity by imparting gnosis to them.

The lost sheep
The most frequent designation of the Simonian Ennoia is "the lost" or "the wandering sheep." The Greek divinities Zeus and Athena were interpreted to signify Hestōs and his Ennoia, and in like manner the Tyrian sun-god Herakles-Melkart and the moon-goddess Selene-Astarte. So also the Homeric Helena, as the cause of quarrel between Greeks and Trojans, was regarded as a type of the Ennoia. The story which the fathers of the church handed down of the intercourse of Simon Magus with his consort Helena (Iren. i. 23; Tertullian de Anima, 34; Epiphanius Haer. 21; Pseudo-Tertullian Haer. 1; Philaster, Haer. 29; Philos. vi. 14, 15; Recogn. Clem. ii. 12; Hom. ii. 25), had probably its origin in this allegorical interpretation, according to Richard Adelbert Lipsius (1867).

Hestōs
In the Simonian Apophasis the great dynamis (also called Nous) and the great epinoia which gives birth to all things form a syzygy, from which proceeds the male-female Being, who is called Hestōs (Philos. vi. 13). Elsewhere nous and epinoia are called the upper-most of the three Simonian Syzygies, to which the Hestōs forms the Hebdomad: but on the other hand, nous and epinoia are identified with heaven and earth (Philos. vi. 9sqq.).

Valentinus

The most significant development of this Sophia mythos is found in the Valentinian system. The descent of the Sophia from the Pleroma is ascribed after Plato's manner to a fall, and as the final cause of this fall a state of suffering is indicated which has penetrated into the Pleroma itself. Sophia or Mētēr is in the doctrine of Valentinus the last, i.e. the thirtieth Aeon in the Pleroma, from which having fallen out, she now in remembrance of the better world which she has thus forsaken, gives birth to the Christus "with a shadow" (meta skias tinos). While Christus returns to the Pleroma, Sophia forms the Demiurge and this whole lower world out of the skia, a right and a left principle (Iren. Haer. i. 11, 1). For her redemption comes down to Sophia either Christus himself (Iren. i. 15, 3) or the Soter (Iren. i. 11, 1, cf. exc. ex Theod. 23; 41), as the common product of the Aeons, in order to bring her back to the Pleroma and unite her again with her syzygos.

Motive
The motive for the Sophia's fall was defined according to the Anatolian school to have lain therein, that by her desire to know what lay beyond the limits of the knowable she had brought herself into a state of ignorance and formlessness. Her suffering extends to the whole Pleroma. In the work of redemption the Soter comes down accompanied by the masculine angels who are to be the future syzygoi of the (feminine) souls of the Pneumatici, and introduces the Sophia along with these Pneumatici into the heavenly bridal chamber (Exc. ex Theod. 29–42; Iren. i. 2, 3). The same view, essentially meets us in the accounts of Marcus, (Iren. i. 18, 4; cf. 15, 3; 16, 1, 2; 17, 1) and in the Epitomators of the Syntagma of Hippolytus (Pseudo-Tertullian Haer. 12; Philaster, Haer. 38).

Achamōth
The Italic school distinguished on the other hand a two-fold Sophia, the ano Sophia and the katō Sophia or Achamoth.

Ptolemaeus

Fall
According to the doctrine of Ptolemaeus and that of his disciples, the former of these separates herself from her syzygos, the  through her audacious longing after immediate Communion with the Father of all, falls into a condition of suffering, and would completely melt away in this inordinate desire, unless the Horos had purified her from her suffering and established her again in the Pleroma.

The place of the Midst
From her dwelling-place above the Hebdomad, in the place of the Midst, she is also called Ogdoad (Ὀγδοάς), and further entitled Mētēr, Sophia also, and he Hierousalēm, Pneuma hagion, and  Kyrios. In these names some partial reminiscences of the old Ophitic Gnosis are retained.

Repentance
Left alone in her suffering she has become endued with penitent mind. By his appointment the Achamoth produces the pneumatic seed (the ).

Redemption
The end of the world's history is here also (as above) the introduction of the lower Sophia with all her pneumatic offspring into the Pleroma, and this intimately connected with the second descent of the Soter and his transient union with the psychical Christus; then follows the marriage-union of the Achamoth with the Soter and of the pneumatic souls with the angels (Iren. i. 1–7; exc. ex Theod. 43–65).

Two-fold Sophia
The same form of doctrine meets us also in Secundus, who is said to have been the first to have made the distinction of an upper and a lower Sophia (Iren. i. 11, 2), and in the account which the Philosophumena give us of a system which most probably referred to the school of Heracleon, and which also speaks of a double Sophia (Philos. vi.). The name Jerusalem also for the exō Sophia meets us here (Philos. vi. 29). It finds its interpretation in the fragments of Heracleon (ap. Origen. in Joann. tom. x. 19). The name Achamoth, on the other hand, is wanting both in Hippolytus and in Heracleon. One school among the Marcosians seems also to have taught a two-fold Sophia (Iren. i. 16, 3; cf. 21, 5).

Etymology
August Hahn (1819) debated whether the name Achamōth (Ἀχαμώθ) is originally derived from the Hebrew Chokhmah (חָכְמָ֑ה), in Aramaic Ḥachmūth or whether it signifies 'She that brings forth'—'Mother.' The Syriac form Ḥachmūth is testified for us as used by Bardesanes (Ephraim, Hymn 55), the Greek form Hachamōth is found only among the Valentinians: the name however probably belongs to the oldest Syrian Gnosis.

Bardesanes
Cosmogonic myths play their part also in the doctrine of Bardesanes. The locus foedus whereon the gods (or Aeons) measured and founded Paradise (Ephraim, Hymn 55) is the same as the impure mētra, which Ephraim is ashamed even to name (cf. also Ephraim, Hymn 14). The creation of the world is brought to pass through the son of the living one and the Rūha d' Qudshā, the Holy Spirit, with whom Ḥachmūth is identical, but in combination with "creatures," i.e. subordinate beings which co-operate with them (Ephraim, Hymn 3). It is not expressly so said, and yet at the same time is the most probable assumption, that as was the case with the father and mother so also their offspring the son of the Living One, and the Rūha d' Qudshā or Ḥachmūth, are to be regarded as a Syzygy. This last (the Ḥachmūth) brings forth the two daughters, the "Shame of the Dry Land" i.e. the mētra, and the "Image of the Waters" i.e. the Aquatilis Corporis typus, which is mentioned in connection with the Ophitic Sophia (Ephraim, Hymn 55). Beside which, in a passage evidently referring to Bardesanes, air, fire, water, and darkness are mentioned as aeons (Īthyē: Hymn 41) These are probably the "Creatures" to which in association with the Son and the Rūha d' Qudshā, Bardesanes is said to have assigned the creation of the world.

Though much still remains dark as to the doctrine of Bardesanes we cannot nevertheless have any right to set simply aside the statements of Ephraim, who remains the oldest Syrian source for our knowledge of the doctrine of this Syrian Gnostic, and deserves therefore our chief attentions. Bardesanes, according to Ephraim, is able also to tell of the wife or maiden who having sunk down from the Upper Paradise offers up prayers in her dereliction for help from above, and on being heard returns to the joys of the Upper Paradise (Ephraim, Hymn 55).

Acts of Thomas
These statements of Ephraim are further supplemented by the Acts of Thomas in which various hymns have been preserved which are either compositions of Bardesanes himself, or at any rate are productions of his school.

Hymn of the Pearl
In the Syriac text of the Acts, we find the Hymn of the Pearl, where the soul which has been sent down from her heavenly home to fetch the pearl guarded by the serpent, but has forgotten here below her heavenly mission until she is reminded of it by a letter from "the father, the mother, and the brother," performs her task, receives back again her glorious dress, and returns to her old home.

Ode to the Sophia
Of the other hymns which are preserved in the Greek version more faithfully than in the Syriac text which has undergone Catholic revision, the first deserving of notice is the Ode to the Sophia which describes the marriage of the "maiden" with her heavenly bridegroom and her introduction into the Upper Realm of Light. This "maiden," called "daughter of light," is not as the Catholic reviser supposes the Church, but Ḥachmūth (Sophia) over whose head the "king," i.e. the father of the living ones, sits enthroned; her bridegroom is, according to the most probable interpretation, the son of the living one, i.e. Christ. With her the living Ones i.e. pneumatic souls enter into the Pleroma and receive the glorious light of the living Father and praise along with "the living spirit" the "father of truth" and the "mother of wisdom."

First prayer of consecration
The Sophia is also invoked in the first prayer of consecration. She is there called the "merciful mother," the "consort of the masculine one," "revealant of the perfect mysteries," "Mother of the Seven Houses," "who finds rest in the eighth house," i.e. in the Ogdoad. In the second Prayer of Consecration she is also designated, the "perfect Mercy" and "Consort of the Masculine One," but is also called "Holy Spirit" (Syriac Rūha d' Qudshā) "Revealant of the Mysteries of the whole Magnitude," "hidden Mother," "She who knows the Mysteries of the Elect," and "she who partakes in the conflicts of the noble Agonistes" (i.e. of Christ, cf. exc. ex Theod. 58 ho megas agōnistēs Iēsous).

There is further a direct reminiscence of the doctrine of Bardesanes when she is invoked as the Holy Dove which has given birth to the two twins, i.e. the two daughters of the Rūha d' Qudshā (ap. Ephraim, Hymn 55).

Pistis Sophia
A special and richly coloured development is given to the mythical form of the Sophia of the Gnostic book Pistis Sophia. The two first books of this writing to which the name Pistis Sophia properly belongs, treat for the greater part (pp. 42–181) of the fall, the Repentance, and the Redemption of the Sophia.

Fall
She has by the ordinance of higher powers obtained an insight into the dwelling-place appropriated to her in the spiritual world, namely, the thēsauros lucis which lies beyond the XIIIth Aeon. By her endeavours to direct thither her upward flight, she draws upon herself the enmity of the Authadēs, Archon of the XIIIth Aeon, and of the Archons of the XII Aeons under him; by these she is enticed down into the depths of chaos, and is there tormented in the greatest possible variety of ways, in order that she may thus incur the loss of her light-nature.

Repentance
In her utmost need she addresses thirteen penitent prayers (metanoiai) to the Upper Light. Step by step she is led upwards by Christus into the higher regions, though she still remains obnoxious to the assaults of the Archons, and is, after offering her XIIIth Metanoia, more vehemently attacked than ever, until at length Christus leads her down into an intermediate place below the XIIIth Aeon, where she remains until the consummation of the world, and sends up grateful hymns of praise and thanksgiving.

Redemption
The earthly work of redemption having been at length accomplished, the Sophia returns to her original celestial home. The peculiar feature in this representation consists in the further development of the philosophical ideas which find general expression in the Sophia mythos. According to Karl Reinhold von Köstlin (1854), Sophia is here not merely, as with Valentinus, the representative of the longing which the finite spirit feels for the knowledge of the infinite, but at the same time a type or pattern of faith, of repentance, and of hope.<ref>{{cite journal|first=Karl Reinhold von|last=Köstlin|title=Das Gnostische System des Buches Pistis Sophia|editor1-last=Baur|editor1-first=F.C.|editor2-last=Zeller|editor2-first=Eduard|journal=Theol. Jahrbücher|year=1854|page=189}}</ref> After her restoration she announces to her companions the twofold truth that, while every attempt to overstep the divinely ordained limits, has for its consequence suffering and punishment, so, on the other hand, the divine compassion is ever ready to vouchsafe pardon to the penitent.

Light-Maiden
We have a further reminiscence of the Sophia of the older Gnostic systems in what is said in the book Pistis Sophia of the Light-Maiden (parthenos lucis), who is there clearly distinguished from the Sophia herself, and appears as the archetype of Astraea, the Constellation Virgo. The station which she holds is in the place of the midst, above the habitation assigned to the Sophia in the XIIIth Aeon. She is the judge of (departed) souls, either opening for them or closing against them the portals of the light-realm (pp. 194–295). Under her stand yet seven other light-maidens with similar functions, who impart to pious souls their final consecrations (pp. 291 sq. 327 sq. 334). From the place of the parthenos lucis comes the sun-dragon, which is daily borne along by four light-powers in the shape of white horses, and so makes his circuit round the earth (p. 183, cf. pp. 18, 309).

Manichaeism
This light-maiden (parthenos tou phōtos) encounters us also among the Manichaeans as exciting the impure desires of the Daemons, and thereby setting free the light which has hitherto been held down by the power of darkness (Dispuiat. Archelai et Manetis, c. 8, n. 11; Theodoret., h. f. I. 26). On the other hand, the place of the Gnostic Sophia is among Manichaeans taken by the "Mother of Life" (mētēr tēs zōēs), and by the World-Soul (psychē hapantōn), which on occasions is distinguished from the Life-Mother, and is regarded as diffused through all living creatures, whose deliverance from the realm of darkness constitutes the whole of the world's history (Titus of Bostra, adv. Manich. I., 29, 36, ed. Lagarde, p. 17 sqq. 23; Alexander Lycopolites c. 3; Epiphan. Their return to the world of light is described in the famous Canticum Amatorium (ap. Augustin. c. Faust, iv. 5 sqq).

Nag Hammadi texts
In On the Origin of the World, Sophia is depicted as the ultimate destroyer of this material universe, Yaldabaoth and all his Heavens:

Mythology
Carl Jung linked the figure of Sophia to the highest archetype of the anima in depth psychology. The archetypal fall and recovery of Sophia is additionally linked (to a varying degree) to many different myths and stories (see damsel in distress). Among these are:
Isis, who while still in the cosmic womb, brings forth the flawed Elder Horus without a consort
The abduction and rescue of Helen of Troy
Persephone and her descent into Hades, from which she returns to life [but is bound to return to Hades for 6 months every year]
The fall of Eve and the birth of Christ through the Virgin Mary
The descent of Orpheus into the underworld to rescue his wife, Eurydice
The return of Odysseus to his kingdom, Ithaca, to reclaim his wife, Penelope
The rescue of Andromeda by Perseus
Ishtar's descent to the Underworld, in the Epic of Gilgamesh
Pandora
 Cinderella and Sleeping Beauty
The slaying of the Dragon by St. George to rescue the Princess
The rescue of the kidnapped Sita by her husband, the god-king Rama, with the help of Hanuman in the Ramayana

Note that many of these myths have alternative psychological interpretations.  For example, Jungian psychologist Marie-Louise von Franz interpreted fairy tales like Sleeping Beauty as symbolizing the 'rescue' or reintegration of the anima, the more 'feminine' part of a man's unconscious,  but not wisdom or sophia'' per se.

See also

Allat
Anat
Asherah
Binah
Chokhmah
Fatimah
Holy Spirit
Isis
Mary, mother of Jesus
Nana (Kushan goddess)
Nanaya
Ruha
Star of Ishtar
Shekhinah
Venus
Yushamin

References

Attribution

Gnosticism
Gnostic deities
Wisdom goddesses
Greek goddesses